Her Mad Bargain is a 1921 American drama film directed by Edwin Carewe and written by Josephine Quirk. The film stars Anita Stewart, Arthur Edmund Carewe, Helen Raymond, Adele Farrington, Margaret McWade, and Percy Challenger. The film was released on December 12, 1921, by Associated First National Pictures.

Plot
As described in a film magazine, Alice Lambert (Stewart), after spending ten years in idleness and luxury, finds herself without funds and must make her way in the world. She becomes a cloak model, but the proprietor of the shop proves to be a despicable character and she leaves when he attempts to embrace her. She next secures work as an artist's model, but flees from the studio half clad when the artist attempts to make violent love to her. She seeks refuge in another studio belonging to artist David Leighton (McGrail), who prevents her suicide by offering to loan her $50,000. In return, she is to take out a life insurance policy for $75,000 for one year. At the end of the year, of course, she is supposed to die and David would be ahead by $25,000. This scheme results in several incidents and a happy ending.

Cast      
Anita Stewart as Alice Lambert
Arthur Edmund Carewe as Grant Lewis
Helen Raymond as Mrs. Henry Beresford
Adele Farrington as Mrs. Gordon Howe
Margaret McWade as Mrs. Dunn
Percy Challenger as Parsons
Walter McGrail as David Leighton
Gertrude Astor as Ruth Beresford
George B. Williams as Monsieur Armand
Ernest Butterworth Jr. as Jerry Dunn Jr.
Will Badger as Jerry Dunn Sr.

References

External links

1921 films
1920s English-language films
Silent American drama films
1921 drama films
First National Pictures films
Films directed by Edwin Carewe
American silent feature films
American black-and-white films
1920s American films